The 1926 Milan Grand Prix was a Grand Prix motor race held at Monza on 12 September 1926. The race was held over 40 laps of the 10 km circuit, for a total race distance of 400 km. The race was won by Bartolomeo Costantini driving a Bugatti.

As the race was held just one week after the 1926 Italian Grand Prix, also held at Monza, many of the entrants were the same. However, as this race was held to Formula Libre regulations, a much larger entry was attracted. The Bugatti team chose to use their 2-litre 1925 cars as they had at the Spanish Grand Prix earlier in the year.

Prizes were awarded for outright position, as well as three classes based on engine capacity: Class E for cars up to 2 litres, class F for cars up to 1.5 litres, and class G for cyclecars up to 1.1 litres. A special category was also used for cars over 2 litres.

Classification

References

Milan Grand Prix
Milan Grand Prix